Rodney Wright (born in Nyngan, New South Wales) is an Australian former professional rugby league footballer, a lock forward with the Penrith Panthers in the National Rugby League competition. He later taught as a rugby league coach and as a behavioural teacher at Coombabah State High School.

Sources
 Whiticker, Alan & Hudson, Glen (2006) The Encyclopedia of Rugby League Players, Gavin Allen Publishing, Sydney

References

Living people
Australian rugby league players
Australian schoolteachers
Penrith Panthers players
Rugby league locks
Rugby league players from Nyngan, New South Wales
Year of birth missing (living people)